Andres Oper (born 7 November 1977) is an Estonian football coach and former professional player. He is currently an assistant manager of Estonia national team.

Oper played as a forward for Lelle, Flora, Tervis Pärnu, AaB, Torpedo Moscow, Roda JC, Shanghai Shenhua, ADO Den Haag, AEK Larnaca, Nea Salamina and the Estonia national team. With 38 goals in 134 appearances, Oper is Estonia's all-time record goalscorer. Oper was named Estonian Footballer of the Year three times, in 1999, 2002 and 2005, and won the Estonian Silverball award twice, in 2001 and 2005.

Early life
Oper was born in Tallinn. He graduated from the Tallinn Secondary School No. 37. He started playing football with Tallinna Jalgpallikool under Aivar Tiidus, before moving to Taivo Uibo's Uibo Poisid and then LMSK/Pantrid, coached by Aavo Sarap.

Club career

Flora
In 1995, Oper signed for Flora. He won his first Meistriliiga title in the 1994–95 season. Oper soon became a first team regular and one of the team's leading goalscorers. He won two more league titles in the 1997–98 and the 1998 seasons, as well as the 1997–98 Estonian Cup and the Estonian Supercup in 1998.

AaB
On 2 July 1999, Oper signed for Danish Superliga champions AaB, on a five-year contract for a transfer fee of $1 million (EEK 15 million).

Torpedo Moscow
On 10 July 2003, Oper signed a two-year contract with Russian Premier League club Torpedo Moscow. Often inconsistent in Russia, scoring 8 goals in 53 appearances, Oper was placed on the transfer list after he suffered an injury to his right foot. In 2005, he was linked with a transfer to Sunderland in England, but the contract was never signed.

Roda JC
On 31 August 2005, Oper signed a one-year contract with Dutch Eredivisie club Roda JC for an undisclosed fee. He scored his first Eredivisie goal on 1 October 2005, in a 3–2 win against Vitesse Arnhem. Oper finished the 2005–06 Eredivisie season as the team's joint top scorer alongside Simon Cziommer with 8 goals and signed a contract extension for two more seasons. He was the team's top scorer in the 2006–07 Eredivisie season, scoring 12 goals in the league and 1 in the play-offs. On 16 May 2007, he signed another contract extension with Roda JC until summer 2009.

Shanghai Shenhua
On 19 July 2009, Oper signed a half-year contract with Chinese Super League club Shanghai Shenhua. He made his debut for the club on 2 August 2009, in an away match against Jiangsu Sainty. However, he suffered an injury and eventually terminated his contract with the club.

ADO Den Haag
After an unsuccessful spell in China, Oper returned to the Netherlands and on 21 January 2010, he signed a half-year contract with an option for another year with ADO Den Haag. He made his debut for the club on 13 February 2010 in a home match against Willem II. Oper scored his first goal for ADO Den Haag on 18 April 2010, in a 4–0 win against RKC Waalwijk. His contract extension stalled due to negotiations over personal terms, eventually no agreement was settled and the extension was cancelled. The contract expired in summer.

AEK Larnaca
On 9 September 2010, Oper signed a one-year contract with Cypriot First Division club AEK Larnaca. He scored on his debut against Ethnikos Achna.

Nea Salamina
In January 2012, Oper joined Cypriot First Division club Nea Salamina. He scored his first goal for the club on 3 March in a 2–0 win against Enosis Neon Paralimni.

International career
Oper made his international debut for the Estonia national football team on 19 May 1995, in a 0–2 1995 Baltic Cup defeat against Latvia. He scored his first goal for Estonia on 8 June 1997, in a 2–3 1998 FIFA World Cup qualification loss against Sweden. He won the Estonian Silverball award twice, in 2001 and 2005. On 2 September 2006, Oper played his 100th match for Estonia, a 0–1 UEFA Euro 2008 qualifying defeat against Israel. He ended his international career with a testimonial match on 26 May 2014, after a 1–1 friendly draw against Gibraltar at A. Le Coq Arena. With 38 goals in 134 international appearances, Oper is Estonia's all-time record goalscorer. He played for the Estonia national team for eighteen years in a row.

Career statistics

Club

International

Scores and results list Estonia's goal tally first, score column indicates score after each Oper goal.

Honours
Flora
 Meistriliiga: 1994–95, 1997–98, 1998
 Estonian Cup: 1997–98
 Estonian Supercup: 1998

Individual
 Estonian Footballer of the Year: 1999, 2002, 2005
 Estonian Silverball: 2001, 2005

References

External links

 
 

1977 births
Living people
Footballers from Tallinn
Estonian footballers
FC Flora players
Meistriliiga players
Estonia international footballers
JK Tervis Pärnu players
AaB Fodbold players
Estonian expatriate footballers
Expatriate men's footballers in Denmark
Estonian expatriate sportspeople in Denmark
Danish Superliga players
FC Torpedo Moscow players
Expatriate footballers in Russia
Estonian expatriate sportspeople in Russia
Russian Premier League players
Roda JC Kerkrade players
Expatriate footballers in the Netherlands
Estonian expatriate sportspeople in the Netherlands
Eredivisie players
FIFA Century Club
Shanghai Shenhua F.C. players
Expatriate footballers in China
Estonian expatriate sportspeople in China
Chinese Super League players
ADO Den Haag players
AEK Larnaca FC players
Expatriate footballers in Cyprus
Estonian expatriate sportspeople in Cyprus
Cypriot First Division players
Nea Salamis Famagusta FC players
Association football forwards